The 17th arrondissement of Paris (XVIIe arrondissement) is one of the 20 arrondissements of the capital city of France. In spoken French, it is referred to as le dix-septième ("the seventeenth").

The arrondissement, known as Batignolles-Monceau, is situated on the right bank of the River Seine. In 2019, it had a population of 166,543. It borders the inner suburbs of Neuilly-sur-Seine, Levallois-Perret and Clichy in Hauts-de-Seine to the northwest, as well as Saint-Ouen-sur-Seine in Seine-Saint-Denis to the northeast.

Geography
The land area of the 17th arrondissement is 5.669 km2 (2.189 sq. miles, or 1,401 acres).

Situated on the right bank (Rive Droite) of the River Seine, it is divided into four administrative districts: Ternes and Monceau in the southwestern part, two upper-class districts which are more Haussmannian in style; in the middle of the arrondissement, the Batignolles district, an area mostly occupied by young families or couples, with a marked gentrification process; in the northeastern part, the Épinettes district, a former industrial district gone residential, which is mainly middle class and also experiencing a less advanced gentrification process.

The town hall of the 17th arrondissement is on the Rue des Batignolles. It is the only town hall of Paris to be located in a modern building. The original building was torn down in 1971 to make room for the current edifice. The 17th arrondissement also hosts the Palais des Congrès of Paris, a large exhibition centre with an associated high-rise hotel, the Hyatt Regency Paris Étoile, the largest in the city.

Demographics
The peak population of Paris's 17th arrondissement was reached in 1954, when it had 231,987 inhabitants. Today, the arrondissement remains dense in population and business activity, with 160,860 inhabitants and 92,267 jobs as of the 1999 census.

Historical population

Immigration

Economy
The southwestern part of the arrondissement is very dense in offices, mostly for services. Several large companies have their headquarters there. The head office of Dailymotion is located in the Immeuble Horizons 17. When it existed, Gaz de France had its head office in the 17th arrondissement.

Batignolles and Épinettes, two former industrial areas, are now mostly residential. The area around the Avenue de Clichy, shared with the 8th, 9th and 18th arrondissements, is occupied by a great variety of shops, making it the third-largest avenue of Paris in terms of sales.

Places of interest
 Arc de Triomphe (partial)
 Marché des Batignolles
 Marché Poncelet
 Rue de Levis
 Musée national Jean-Jacques Henner
 Palais des Congrès and Hôtel Concorde Lafayette
 Square des Batignolles
 Cité des Fleurs
 Place de Clichy
 Parc Clichy-Batignolles
 Square des Épinettes
 Notre-Dame-de-la-Compassion, Paris (former royal chapel with stained glass designed by Ingres)

Education

The Swedish school Svenska Skolan Paris is located in the arrondissement.

References

External links